Peter Junas is a Slovak professional ice hockey player who played with HC Slovan Bratislava in the Slovak Extraliga.

References

Living people
HC Slovan Bratislava players
Slovak ice hockey left wingers
Czechoslovak ice hockey left wingers
Sportspeople from Poprad
1968 births